The Decameron (or Decamerone ), subtitled Prince Galehaut (Old  ) and sometimes nicknamed l'Umana commedia ("the Human comedy", as it was Boccaccio that dubbed Dante Alighieri's Comedy "Divine"), is a collection of short stories by the 14th-century Italian author Giovanni Boccaccio (1313–1375). The book is structured as a frame story containing 100 tales told by a group of seven young women and three young men; they shelter in a secluded villa just outside Florence in order to escape the Black Death, which was afflicting the city. Boccaccio probably conceived of the Decameron after the epidemic of 1348, and completed it by 1353. The various tales of love in The Decameron range from the erotic to the tragic. Tales of wit, practical jokes, and life lessons contribute to the mosaic. In addition to its literary value and widespread influence (for example on Chaucer's Canterbury Tales), it provides a document of life at the time. Written in the vernacular of the Florentine language, it is considered a masterpiece of classical early Italian prose.

Title

Boccaccio's subtitle, Prencipe Galeotto, refers to Galehaut, a fictional king portrayed in the 13th-century Lancelot-Grail who was sometimes called by the title haut prince "high prince". Galehaut was a close friend of Lancelot, but an enemy of King Arthur. When Galehaut learned that Lancelot loved Arthur's wife, Guinevere, he set aside his own ardor for Lancelot in order to arrange a meeting between his friend and Guinevere. At this meeting the Queen first kisses Lancelot, and so begins their love affair.

In Canto V of Inferno, Dante compares these fictional lovers with the real-life paramours Francesca da Rimini and Paolo Malatesta, whose relationship he fictionalises. In Inferno, Francesca and Paolo read of Lancelot and Guinevere, and the story impassions them to lovemaking.

Dante's description of Galehaut's munificence and savoir-faire amidst this intrigue impressed Boccaccio. By invoking the name Prencipe Galeotto in the alternative title to Decameron, Boccaccio alludes to a sentiment he expresses in the text: his compassion for women deprived of free speech and social liberty, confined to their homes and, at times, lovesick. He contrasts this life with that of the men free to enjoy hunting, fishing, riding, and falconry.

Frame story

In Italy during the time of the Black Death, a group of seven young women and three young men flee from plague-ridden Florence to a deserted villa in the countryside of Fiesole for two weeks. To pass the evenings, each member of the party tells a story each night, except for one day per week for chores, and the holy days during which they do no work at all, resulting in ten nights of storytelling over the course of two weeks. Thus, by the end of the fortnight they have told 100 stories.

Each of the ten characters is charged as King or Queen of the company for one of the ten days in turn. This charge extends to choosing the theme of the stories for that day, and all but two days have topics assigned: examples of the power of fortune; examples of the power of human will; love tales that end tragically; love tales that end happily; clever replies that save the speaker; tricks that women play on men; tricks that people play on each other in general; examples of virtue. Only Dioneo, who usually tells the tenth tale each day, has the right to tell a tale on any topic he wishes, due to his wit. Many commentators have argued that Dioneo expresses the views of Boccaccio himself. Each day also includes a short introduction and conclusion to continue the frame of the tales by describing other daily activities besides story-telling. These framing interludes frequently include transcriptions of Italian folk songs. The interactions among tales in a day, or across days, as Boccaccio spins variations and reversals of previous material, forms a whole and not just a collection of stories. Recurring plots of the stories include mocking the lust and greed of the clergy; female lust and ambition on a par with male lust and ambition; tensions in Italian society between the new wealthy commercial class and noble families; and the perils and adventures of traveling merchants.

Analysis

Throughout the Decameron the mercantile ethic prevails and predominates. The commercial and urban values of quick wit, sophistication, and intelligence are treasured, while the vices of stupidity and dullness are cured, or punished. While these traits and values may seem obvious to the modern reader, they were an emerging feature in Europe with the rise of urban centers and a monetized economic system beyond the traditional rural feudal and monastery systems which placed greater value on piety and loyalty. 

Beyond the unity provided by the frame narrative, the Decameron provides a unity in philosophical outlook. Throughout runs the common medieval theme of Lady Fortune, and how quickly one can rise and fall through the external influences of the "Wheel of Fortune". Boccaccio had been educated in the tradition of Dante's Divine Comedy, which used various levels of allegory to show the connections between the literal events of the story and the Christian message. However, the Decameron uses Dante's model not to educate the reader but to satirize this method of learning. The Catholic Church, priests, and religious belief become the satirical source of comedy throughout. This was part of a wider historical trend in the aftermath of the Black Death which saw widespread discontent with the church.

Many details of the Decameron are infused with a medieval sense of numerological and mystical significance. For example, it is widely believed that the seven young women are meant to represent the Four Cardinal Virtues (Prudence, Justice, Temperance, and Fortitude) and the Three Theological Virtues (Faith, Hope, and Charity). It is further supposed that the three men represent the classical Greek tripartite division of the soul (Reason, Spirit, and Appetite, see Book IV of Republic). Boccaccio himself notes that the names he gives for these ten characters are in fact pseudonyms chosen as "appropriate to the qualities of each". The Italian names of the seven women, in the same (most likely significant) order as given in the text, are Pampinea, Fiammetta, Filomena, Emilia, Lauretta, Neifile, and Elissa. The men, in order, are Panfilo, Filostrato, and Dioneo.

Boccaccio focused on the naturalness of sex by combining and interlacing sexual experiences with nature.

Literary sources

Boccaccio borrowed the plots of almost all his stories (just as later writers borrowed from him). Although he consulted only French, Italian and Latin sources, some of the tales have their origin in such far-off lands as India, the Middle East, Spain, and other places. Some were already centuries old. For example, part of the tale of Andreuccio of Perugia (Day II, Story 5) originated in 2nd-century Ephesus (in the Ephesian Tale). Even the description of the central motivating event of the narrative, the Black Plague (which Boccaccio surely witnessed), is not original, but is based on a description in the Historia gentis Langobardorum of Paul the Deacon, who lived in the 8th century. Boccaccio also drew on Ovid's works as inspiration. He has been called "the Italian Ovid," both because of his writing as well as his relationship to Ovid.

Some scholars have suggested that some of the tales for which no prior source has been found may still not have been invented by Boccaccio, but may have been circulating in the local oral tradition. Boccaccio himself says that he heard some of the tales orally. In VII, 1, for example, he claims to have heard the tale from an old woman who heard it as a child.

The fact that Boccaccio borrowed the story lines that make up most of the Decameron does not mean he mechanically reproduced them. Most of the stories take place in the 14th century and have been sufficiently updated to the author's time that a reader may not know that they had been written centuries earlier or in a foreign culture. Also, Boccaccio often combined two or more unrelated tales into one (such as in II, 2 and VII, 7).

Moreover, many of the characters actually existed, such as Giotto di Bondone, Guido Cavalcanti, Saladin, and King William II of Sicily. Scholars have even been able to verify the existence of less famous characters, such as the tricksters Bruno and Buffalmacco and their victim Calandrino. Still other fictional characters are based on real people, such as the Madonna Fiordaliso from tale II, 5, who is derived from a Madonna Flora who lived in the red light district of Naples. Boccaccio often intentionally muddled historical (II, 3) and geographical (V, 2) facts for his narrative purposes. Within the tales of the Decameron, the principal characters are usually developed through their dialogue and actions, so that by the end of the story they seem real and their actions logical given their context.

Another of Boccaccio's frequent techniques was to make already existing tales more complex. A clear example of this is in tale IX, 6, which was also used by Chaucer in his "The Reeve's Tale", which more closely follows the original French source than does Boccaccio's version. In the Italian version, the host's wife and the two young male visitors occupy all three beds and she also creates an explanation of the happenings of the evening. Both elements are Boccaccio's invention and make for a more complex version than either Chaucer's version or the French source (a fabliau by Jean de Boves).

Papal censorship
Despite its enduring popularity, the Decameron's overtly anti-clerical stances frequently brought the work into conflict with the Catholic church. The first instance occurred when the Dominican Friar Girolamo Savonarola incited a bonfire of 'sinful' art and literature in the centre of Florence known later as the "Bonfire of the Vanities". The Decameron was among the works known to have been burned that day.

More official clerical challenges would follow upon the creation of the Index Librorum Prohibitorum. Instituted by Pope Paul IV in 1559, the Index was a list of texts that were officially anathema to the Catholic Church; Boccaccio's Decameron was among the original texts included. Despite this, the book continued to circulate and grow in popularity, prompting Gregory XIII to commission a revised edition in 1573 in which the clergymen were replaced with secular people. Even this would prove to be too immoral for Sixtus V who commissioned another revision during his time as Cardinal resulting in the 1582  edition by Salviati.

Translations into English
The Decamerons individual tales were translated into English early on (such as poet William Walter's 1525 Here begynneth y[e] hystory of Tytus & Gesyppus translated out of Latyn into Englysshe by Wyllyam Walter, somtyme seruaunte to Syr Henry Marney, a translation of tale X.viii), or served as source material for English authors such as Chaucer to rework. The table below lists all attempts at a complete English translation of the book. The information on pre-1971 translations is compiled from the G. H. McWilliam's introduction to his own 1971 translation.

Incomplete

Complete

Notable early translations
It can be generally said that Petrarch's version in Rerum senilium libri XVII, 3, included in a letter he wrote to his friend Boccaccio, was to serve as a source for all the many versions that circulated around Europe, including the translations of the very Decameron into Catalan (first recorded translation into a foreign language, anonymously hand-written in Sant Cugat in 1429; later retranslated by Bernat Metge), French and Spanish.

The famous first tale (I, 1) of the notorious Ser Ciappelletto was later translated into Latin by Olimpia Fulvia Morata and translated again by Voltaire.

Adaptations

Theatre
 William Shakespeare's 1605 play All's Well That Ends Well is based on tale III, 9. Shakespeare probably first read a French translation of the tale in William Painter's Palace of Pleasure.
 Posthumus's wager on Imogen's chastity in Cymbeline was taken by Shakespeare from an English translation of a 15th-century German tale, "Frederyke of Jennen", whose basic plot came from tale II, 9.
 Lope de Vega adapted at least twelve stories from the Decameron for the theatre, including:
 El ejemplo de casadas y prueba de la paciencia, based on tale X, 10, which was by far the most popular story of the Decameron during the 15th, 16th, and 17th centuries
 Discreta enamorada, based on tale III, 3
 El ruiseñor de Sevilla (They're Not All Nightingales), based on parts of V, 4
 Molière's 1661 play L'école des maris is based on tale III, 3.
 Molière borrowed from tale VII, 4 in his play George Dandin ou le Mari confondu (The Confounded Husband). In both stories the husband is convinced that he has accidentally caused his wife's suicide.
 Thomas Middleton's play The Widow is based on tales II, 2 and III, 3.
 The ring parable from tale I, 3 is at the heart of Gotthold Ephraim Lessing's 1779 play Nathan the Wise.
 Alfred, Lord Tennyson used tale V, 9 for his 1879 play The Falcon.

Prose works
 Martin Luther retells tale I, 2, in which a Jew converts to Catholicism after visiting Rome and seeing the corruption of the Catholic hierarchy. However, in Luther's version (found in his "Table-talk #1899"), Luther and Philipp Melanchthon try to dissuade the Jew from visiting Rome.
 The story of Griselda (X, 10) was also the basis for the 1694 verse novel   by Charles Perrault, later included in his 1697 collection Histoires ou contes du temps passé.
 Jonathan Swift used tale I, 3 for his first major published work, A Tale of a Tub (1704).

Poetry
 The tale of patient Griselda (X, 10) was the source of Chaucer's "The Clerk's Tale". However, there are some scholars who believe that Chaucer may not have been directly familiar with the Decameron, and instead derived it from a Latin translation/retelling of that tale by Petrarch.
 John Keats borrowed the tale of Lisabetta and her pot of basil (IV, 5) for his poem, Isabella, or the Pot of Basil.
 At his death Percy Bysshe Shelley had left a fragment of a poem entitled "Ginevra", which he took from the first volume of an Italian book called L'Osservatore Fiorentino. The plot of that book was in turn taken from tale X, 4.
 Henry Wadsworth Longfellow adapted tale V, 9 for the poem "The Falcon of Ser Federigo", included in his 1863 collection Tales of a Wayside Inn.

Songs
 Tale IV, 1 was the basis for Child ballad 269, "Lady Diamond".

Opera
 The Venetian writer Apostolo Zeno wrote a libretto named Griselda in 1701, based in part on tale X, 10, and in part on Lope de Vega's theatrical adaptation of it, El ejemplo de casadas y prueba de la paciencia. Various composers wrote music for the libretto, including Carlo Francesco Pollarolo (Griselda, 1701), Tomaso Albinoni (Griselda, 1703), Antonio Maria Bononcini (Griselda, 1718), Alessandro Scarlatti (Griselda, 1721), Giovanni Bononcini (Griselda, 1722) and Antonio Vivaldi (Griselda, 1735).
 Giuseppe Petrosinelli in his libretto for Domenico Cimarosa's comic opera The Italian Girl in London uses the story of the heliotrope (bloodstone) in tale VIII, 3.

Film and television
 Decameron Nights (1924) was based on three of the tales.
 Decameron Nights (1953) was based on three of the tales and starred Louis Jourdan as Boccaccio.
 Archandel Gabriel a paní Husa (Archangel Gabriel and Madam Goose) by Jiří Trnka (1965) is an animated puppet film based on a story from Decameron (IV, 2)
 Pier Paolo Pasolini's The Decameron (1971) is an anthology film which includes nine of the stories.
 The 2007 film Virgin Territory is a romantic comedy based on the framing story of the Decameron.
 The 2015 film Wondrous Boccaccio is loosely based on four of the tales.
 The 2017 comedy The Little Hours adapted tales III, 1 and III, 2.

Wrongly considered to be adaptations
 Chaucer's "The Franklin's Tale" shares its plot with tale X, 5, although this is not due to a direct borrowing from Boccaccio. Rather, both authors used a common French source.
 The motif of the three trunks in The Merchant of Venice by Shakespeare is found in tale X, 1. However, both Shakespeare and Boccaccio probably came upon the tale in Gesta Romanorum.

Collections emulating the Decameron
 Marguerite de Navarre's Heptaméron is heavily based on the Decameron.
 Christoph Martin Wieland's set of six novellas, Das Hexameron von Rosenhain, is based on the structure of the Decameron.
 In 2020 State Theatre Company of South Australia and ActNow Theatre created a project called Decameron 2.0 in response to the COVID-19 crisis, which involved 10 writers creating 10 stories each over 10 weeks, loosely connected to themes in the Decameron.
 Also in response to the ongoing COVID-19 pandemic, the July 12, 2020 issue of The New York Times Magazine featured a short story collection entitled The Decameron Project, with new writings from contemporary authors including Margaret Atwood, and illustrations by Sophy Hollington and other artists.
Published in 2021, The San Diego Decameron Project Anthology features 100 stories from 100 San Diegan authors based loosely around the theme of the COVID-19 pandemic, in tribute to the Decameron. The collection is presented by Write Out Loud, San Diego Public Library, La Jolla Historical Society, and San Diego Writers Ink.

Boccaccio's drawings

Since the Decameron was very popular among contemporaries, especially merchants, many manuscripts of it survive. The Italian philologist Vittore Branca did a comprehensive survey of them and identified a few copied under Boccaccio's supervision; some have notes written in Boccaccio's hand. Two in particular have elaborate drawings, probably done by Boccaccio himself. Since these manuscripts were widely circulated, Branca thought that they influenced all subsequent illustrations. In 1962 Branca identified Codex Hamilton 90, in Berlin's Staatsbibliothek, as an autograph belonging to Boccaccio's latter years.

See also

 Cent Nouvelles Nouvelles
 One Thousand and One Nights
 The Masque of the Red Death
 The Plague (novel)
 Summary of Decameron novellas

References

External links

 Decameron Web, from Brown University
 The Decameron – Introduction from the Internet Medieval Sourcebook
 The Enchanted Garden, a painting by John William Waterhouse
 
 (Rigg translation)
 (Rigg translation)
 (Payne translation)
 Decameron – English and Italian text for a direct comparison
 

 
14th-century books
1353 short story collections
Italian short story collections
1353 in Europe
14th century in Italy
Books adapted into films
Censored books
Culture in Florence
Frame stories
Medieval Italian literature